China has many traditional games, sports, and physical activities.

Extinct games

Chuiwan 
Chuiwan was an ancient Chinese game that can be considered an early form of golf.

Cuju 
Cuju was an ancient Chinese game that is similar to association football.

Traditional games

Jianzi 
In jianzi, players attempt to keep a shuttlecock from falling to the ground by hitting it with any part of their bodies other than their hands.

Martial arts

Board games

Go 
Go is a board game in which players attempt to surround their opponents' pieces on the board with their own pieces in order to "capture" the opponents' pieces. The player that captures the most overall territory on the board wins the game.

Xiangqi 
Xiangqi is a board game with similarities to chess.

Gambling games

Pai gow 
Pai gow is a gambling game played with dominoes, in which the goal is to get four tiles with numbers that add up to nine or more.

Boat racing

Dragon boat 
Dragon boat racing is over 2,000 years old, with either 10 or 20 participants trying to row the dragon boat as fast as possible.

Minority games

Pearl ball 
Pearl ball is a Manchu game with similarities to basketball. Six players from each team compete on a 28x15m court.

See also 

 Traditional games of South Asia

References 

Chinese ancient games